"Maraca" is a song by Swedish-Congolese singer-songwriter Mohombi. The song was written by RedOne, Mohombi, Teddy Sky and Jimmy Joker, and it was produced by RedOne, Sky and Joker. It was released on 2 September 2011 as a digital download in Sweden. It has peaked to number fourteen on the Swedish Singles Chart.

Track listing

Charts

Weekly charts

Year-end charts

Release history

References

2011 singles
Mohombi songs
Songs written by RedOne
Song recordings produced by RedOne
2011 songs
2101 Records singles
Island Records singles
Songs written by Geraldo Sandell
Songs written by Mohombi
Songs written by Jimmy Thörnfeldt